Fundació Noguera is a Catalan nonprofit cultural institution, founded in Barcelona on July 20, 1976, by Raimon Noguera i Guzmán. It seeks to improve the historical coverage of Catalonia in documents, and is responsible for publishing numerous books and publications related to Catalan history and heritage and legal texts of special interest in the evolution of Catalan law etc. The president since 2007 is Joan-Josep López.

References

External links
Official site

Organisations based in Barcelona
1976 establishments in Spain
Organizations established in 1976
Publishing companies of Spain